The 1972 United States presidential election in Utah took place on November 7, 1972, as part of the 1972 United States presidential election. Voters chose four representatives, or electors to the Electoral College, who voted for president and vice president.

Utah overwhelmingly voted for incumbent President Richard Nixon (R-California) with over 67 percent of the popular vote, beating Democratic South Dakota Senator George McGovern with a margin of over forty percent, carrying every county in the state. Nixon carried every county with over sixty percent of the vote except for Carbon County, which had typically been the most Democratic area of the state. U.S. Representative John G. Schmitz (R-California) of the American Independent Party received 5.97 percent of the popular vote, and his results in Utah proved to be his third strongest state in the 1972 election after Idaho and Alaska.

Results

Results by county

See also
 United States presidential elections in Utah

References

Utah
1972
United States presidential